Health Minister (Faroese: landsstýrismaðurin í heilsumálum or heilsumálaráðharrin) has been a governmental ministerial post since 1968 in the government of the Faroe Islands. Health affairs have mostly been a part of a larger ministry, often along with social affairs, but since 2008 it has been a separate ministry.

Notes and references 

Faroe Islands
Health